In Ireland, a town council was part of the second (or lower) tier of local government from 2002 to 2014.

Operating in smaller towns and cities, they exercised limited functions which were subsidiary to those of their relevant county council. The term was introduced into local government in Ireland by the Local Government Act 2001. From 1 January 2002 the existing urban district councils and boards of town commissioners becametown councils. Additionally, the city of Kilkenny, along with the four towns of Sligo, Drogheda, Clonmel, and Wexford, were reduced in status to the level of town council. In recognition of the previous history, the towns were permitted to use the title of "borough council" instead of "town council". There were 75 other town councils in addition to these five borough councils. Outside the towns, the county councils were solely responsible for local services.

On 16 October 2012, the Department of the Environment, Community and Local Government published Putting People First, an "action plan for effective local government". The town councils were abolished in June 2014 under the Local Government Reform Act 2014.

Town councils (2002–2014)

Borough councils (2002–2014)

Establishing and dissolving town councils
Under Section 185 of the 2001 Act, new town councils could be established in any town with a population of at least 7,500. The application had to be made by at least 100 local government electors, or 10% of the electors of the proposed town, whichever is the greater. After a period of public consultation, the application was considered by the county council for the area in which the town is situated. The county council's recommendation was referred to the Local Government Commission. If the commission approved the establishment of a town council, an order signed by the Minister for the Environment, Community and Local Government formally created the new council.

Under Section 187 of the same act, a town council could apply to the minister to be dissolved.

Elected members
Elections were held to town councils every five years. Towns were not subdivided for local elections, being treated as a single constituency. Councillors were elected by the system of proportional representation by means of the single transferable vote. The towns of Bray, Dundalk and Tralee had twelve elected members, all other towns had nine. A town council with nine members could apply for the number to be increased to twelve if the population was greater than 15,000 at the previous census.

Titles of chairpersons
However, Schedule 8 of the Local Government Act 2001 allowed alternative titles for the individuals elected to chair town councils, namely:

In the Irish language  ....... and  ....... followed by the name of the town in Irish
In the English language Mayor of the Town of ....... and Deputy Mayor of the Town of ....... followed by the name of the town in English

See also
Twentieth Amendment of the Constitution of Ireland

References

External links
Local Government Act 2001

 
Local government in the Republic of Ireland